Alabama elected its members August 1–3, 1825, after the term began but before the new Congress convened.

See also 
 1824 and 1825 United States House of Representatives elections
 List of United States representatives from Alabama

1825
Alabama
United States House of Representatives